Vrenz Bleijenbergh (born 14 October 2000) is a Belgian professional basketball player for Filou Oostende of the BNXT League.

Early life and youth career
Bleijenbergh started playing basketball by the age of four with his local club Ticino Merksem. He played the point guard position even though he was tall enough to be a power forward.

Professional career

Antwerp Giants (2018–2021)
In October 2018, Bleijenbergh signed a long-term professional contract with the Antwerp Giants. He turned down college offers from Arizona, Texas Tech and UCLA, among others. Bleijenbergh left secondary school to focus on basketball. He declared for the 2019 NBA draft before withdrawing. In the 2020–21 season, Bleijenbergh became a regular starter with the Antwerp Giants. He was named Pro Basketball League Rising Star at the end of the season. On 1 June 2021, Bleijenbergh declared for the 2021 NBA draft but went undrafted.

Real Betis (2021–2022)
On 10 August 2021, Bleijenbergh signed with Real Betis of the Spanish Liga ACB. On 7 February 2022, he terminated his contract with Real Betis.

Windy City Bulls (2022)
On 26 February 2022, Bleijenbergh was acquired off waivers by the Windy City Bulls.

Oostende (2022–present)
On 1 August 2022, he signed with Filou Oostende of the BNXT League. On 17 September, Bleijenbergh scored 12 points in his Oostende debut during the 2022 BNXT Supercup, which the team won over Heroes Den Bosch.

Long Island Nets
On 12 November 2022, Bleijenbergh's NBA G League rights were traded to the Long Island Nets in exchange for Marcus Zegarowski.

National team career
Bleijenbergh has represented Belgium at several youth international tournaments. He averaged 13.5 points, eight rebounds, a tournament-high six assists and two blocks per game at the 2018 FIBA U18 European Championship Division B in Macedonia, leading his team to a bronze medal. He was named to the All-Tournament Team. At the 2019 FIBA U20 European Championship Division B in Portugal, Bleijenbergh averaged 9.3 points, 6.6 rebounds, 5.6 assists and 2.6 steals per game. He led Belgium to another bronze medal and earned All-Tournament Team honors.

On 24 February 2019, Bleijenbergh made his Belgian senior national team debut, scoring three points against Iceland during EuroBasket 2022 Pre-Qualifiers.

References

External links
 Antwerp Giants bio

2000 births
Living people
Antwerp Giants players
BC Oostende players
Belgian men's basketball players
People from Brasschaat
Real Betis Baloncesto players
Shooting guards
Small forwards
Sportspeople from Antwerp Province
Windy City Bulls players
Belgian expatriate basketball people in Spain
Belgian expatriate basketball people in the United States